A Simple Story is a 1960 Soviet drama film directed by Yuri Yegorov. The picture was the 48th most attended domestic film in the Soviet Union.

Plot 
A woman loses her husband in the war and dedicates her life to the kolkhoz. Many started to dislike Sasha Potapova for her honesty and uncompromising character, however she is elected chairman of the collective farm. Unexpected love to the secretary of the District Committee Danilov makes her life happy and difficult.

Cast
Nonna Mordyukova as Sasha Potapova
Mikhail Ulyanov as Secretary of the Communist Andrey Egorovich Danilov
Vasily Shukshin as Vanka Lykov 
 Daniil Ilchenko as Yegor Lykov, Ivan's father
 Valentina Vladimirova as Avdotya 
 Irina Murzaeva as Sasha's mother  
 Aleksey Mironov as Guskov
 Oleg Anofriev as Agronomist
 Tatyana Babanina as Nastassya Mineeva (as T. Babanina)
 Nina Sazonova as Lyuba

Production
The character of Potapova was specifically written for Nonna Mordyukova. She was born in Kuban into a peasant family and her mother was a kolkhoz chairman.

References

External links

 KinoPoisk

1960 films
1960 drama films
Gorky Film Studio films
Soviet drama films
Soviet black-and-white films